Ruslan Balanda (born 26 December 1992) is a Ukrainian Nordic combined skier. He was born in Kremenets.

He represented Ukraine at the FIS Nordic World Ski Championships 2015 in Falun.

References

External links 
 

1992 births
Living people
Ukrainian male Nordic combined skiers
People from Kremenets
Competitors at the 2015 Winter Universiade
Sportspeople from Ternopil Oblast
21st-century Ukrainian people